The Tromp class was a class of ships of the Royal Netherlands Navy.  The hull shape was also known as the Argonaut 600. They were designed as "flotilla leaders" and their intended role was to be the backbone of a squadron of modern destroyers that was planned at the same time (One of which was finished in the UK and the other in Germany. Two others scrapped). The ships were ordered in 1935;  was launched in 1937, and her sister ship  in 1939. Often referred to as 'light cruisers', they were significantly smaller and less capable than most light cruisers of the era.

At the outbreak of World War II, Tromp was sent to the Dutch East Indies. Jacob van Heemskerck was still being completed in the naval shipyard in Den Helder when the German attack started on 10 May 1940, but she succeeded in escaping to the United Kingdom, where she was completed with a completely different armament set, as an anti-aircraft ship. Both ships served in the Far East and survived the war, Tromp to be decommissioned in 1955 and sold for scrap in 1969 and Jacob van Heemskerck to become an artillery instruction ship in 1947, decommissioned in 1969 and sold for scrap in 1970.

Ships

Citations

References

External links
 Tromp-class destroyer leaders

Cruiser classes